Longling County is a county in Baoshan City, in the west of Yunnan Province, China, bordering Burma's Shan State to the south.

Its capital is the large community Longshan.

The site of the Songshan Battlefield (1944 during the Second Sino-Japanese War) has since 2006 been on the list of monuments of the People's Republic of China.

Administrative divisions
Longling County has 5 towns, 4 townships and 1 ethnic township. 
5 towns

4 townships

1 ethnic township
 Mucheng Yi and Lisu

Climate

References

External links
Longling County Official Site
Longling County Tourism Bureau
West Yunnan Main Battlefield of Anti-Japanese War of Resistance

County-level divisions of Baoshan, Yunnan